El Plan is a district of the Spanish municipality Cartagena. It is located in the east of the western half of the municipality, has an area of 13.165 km2, and was inhabited by 36,080 people in 2020.

The localities of the district are La Guía, which is in the north-west and is home to 122 people; Polígono de Santa Ana, where 7154 live; El Plan, which is inhabited by 220 people; Los Gabatos, which is placed in the south-western quarter and has a population of 5626, Barriada Hispanoamérica, which is also located in the south-western quarter and is home to 3865 people; Los  Dolores, which is placed in the southern half and is inhabited by 7751 people; Urbanización Castillitos, which is located in the south and has a population of 1384 people; Los Barreros, which is also placed in the south and is home to 7030 people and Barriada Cuatro Santos, which is placed in the south-east end and is inhabited by 2573 people.

The district is in an urban continuity with the main city and the northern neighbourhoods of San Antonio Abad district.

Demographics 
7.857% inhabitants are foreigners – 0.848% come from other country of Europe, 5,6% are Africans, 11.14% are Americans and 0,285% are Asians. The table below shows the population trends of the 21st century by its five-year periods.

Main sights 

 El Castillito: it was built in 1900. It has two stages and its outside walls are red in the upper stage and whitish in the lower stage. A remarkable feature of the building is the presence of two cylindrical towers which are adjacent to the main body.
 El Retiro: it started its existence in 1900.

 Torre Llagostera: it was built in the first two decades of the 20th century.

 Casa Barceló: it was built in 1916.

Festivities 

 Festivity in Los Dolores: it takes place during the first third of September. Some activities such as revere flower placement to the virgin takes place during this festive period.

 Festivity in Barriada Hispanoamérica: it is held in the October.

References 

Cartagena, Spain
Populated places in the Region of Murcia